Rattlesnake Creek may refer to:
Rattlesnake Creek (Bronx)
Rattlesnake Creek (Kansas)
Rattlesnake Creek (Ohio)
Rattlesnake Creek (Big Walnut Creek), a stream in Ohio
Rattlesnake Creek (Oregon)
Rattlesnake Creek (Spring Brook)